Henry E. Larkin (January 12, 1860 – January 31, 1942) was a professional baseball player who played Major League Baseball for 10 seasons (1883–1893).

At age 24, Larkin started his career with the Philadelphia Athletics in 1884. On June 16, 1885, he hit for the cycle. That same year in a single game he recorded four doubles, still a major league record that has been tied many times, but never broken.
He played six years with the club, usually hitting above .300. His 7th season he switched leagues to the Players' League, and was the Cleveland Infants' star first baseman, hitting .330 and knocking in 112 RBI. He also managed the club in 1890. When the league disbanded, he returned to Philadelphia, and later finished his career with the Washington Senators. He averaged a .303 batting average for his career. Unlike other power hitters of his era, Larkin hit more of his home runs on the road than at home – 35 versus 18.

See also
 List of Major League Baseball annual doubles leaders
 List of Major League Baseball career triples leaders
 List of Major League Baseball player-managers
 List of Major League Baseball single-game hits leaders
 List of Major League Baseball players to hit for the cycle

References

External links

1860 births
1942 deaths
19th-century baseball players
Major League Baseball first basemen
Philadelphia Athletics (AA) players
Cleveland Infants players
Philadelphia Athletics (AA 1891) players
Washington Senators (1891–1899) players
Baseball players from Pennsylvania
Sportspeople from Reading, Pennsylvania
Reading Actives players
Allentown Kelly's Killers players
Easton (minor league baseball) players
Ashland (minor league baseball) players
Altoona Mad Turtles players
Lancaster Chicks players
Hazleton Quay-kers players
Allentown Goobers players
Pottsville Colts players
Major League Baseball player-managers